, abbreviated as KSL,  is the Japanese fifth tier of league football, which is part of the Japanese Regional Leagues. It covers most of the Kantō region, as well as the prefectures of Chiba, Gunma, Ibaraki, Kanagawa, Saitama, Tochigi, Tokyo and Yamanashi. Its area is thus coextensive with the National Capital Region.

2023 clubs 
 Division 1 

 Division 2

References

External links
Kantō Soccer League official website

Football leagues in Japan
Sports leagues established in 1966